This is a timeline of women in science, spanning from ancient history up to the 21st century. While the timeline primarily focuses on women involved with natural sciences such as astronomy, biology, chemistry and physics, it also includes women from the social sciences (e.g. sociology, psychology) and the formal sciences (e.g. mathematics, computer science), as well as notable science educators and medical scientists. The chronological events listed in the timeline relate to both scientific achievements and gender equality within the sciences.

Ancient history

 1900 BCE: Aganice, also known as Athyrta, was an Egyptian princess during the Middle Kingdom (about 2000–1700 BCE) working on astronomy and natural philosophy.
c. 1500 BCE: Hatshepsut, also known as the Queen Doctor, promoted a botanical expedition searching for officinal plants.
 1200 BCE: The Mesopotamian perfume-maker Tapputi-Belatekallim was referenced in the text of a cuneiform tablet. She is often considered the world's first recorded chemist.
500 BCE: Theano was a Pythagorean philosopher.
c. 150 BCE: Aglaonice became the first female astronomer to be recorded in Ancient Greece.
1st century BCE: A woman known only as Fang became the earliest recorded Chinese woman alchemist. She is credited with "the discovery of how to turn mercury into silver" – possibly the chemical process of boiling off mercury in order to extract pure silver residue from ores.
1st century CE: Mary the Jewess was among the world's first alchemists.
c. 300–350 CE: Greek mathematician Pandrosion develops a numerical approximation for cube roots.
c. 355–415 CE: Greek astronomer, mathematician and philosopher Hypatia became renowned as a respected academic teacher, commentator on mathematics, and head of her own science academy.
3rd century CE: Cleopatra the Alchemist, an early figure in chemistry and practical alchemy, is credited as inventing the alembic.

Middle Ages

 c. 975 CE: Chinese alchemist Keng Hsien-Seng was employed by the Royal Court. She distilled perfumes, utilized an early form of the  Soxhlet process to extract camphor into alcohol, and gained recognition for her skill in using mercury to extract silver from ores.
10th century: Al-ʻIjliyyah manufactured astrolabes for the court of Sayf al-Dawla in Aleppo.
Early 12th century: Dobrodeia of Kiev (died 1131), a Rus' princess, was the first woman to write a treatise on medicine.
 Early 12th century: The Italian medical practitioner Trota of Salerno compiled medical works on women's ailments and skin diseases.
 12th century: Adelle of the Saracens taught at the Salerno School of Medicine.
 12th century: Hildegard of Bingen (1098–1179) was a founder of scientific natural history in Germany.
 1159: The Alsatian nun Herrad of Landsberg (1130–1195) compiled the scientific compendium Hortus deliciarum.
 1220s: Zulema the Astrologist was a Muslim astronomer in Medina Mayurqa.
 Early 14th century: Adelmota of Carrara was a physician in Padua, Italy.

16th century 

 1561: Italian alchemist Isabella Cortese published her popular book The Secrets of Lady Isabella Cortese. The work included recipes for medicines, distilled oils and cosmetics, and was the only book published by a female alchemist in the 16th century.
1572: Italian botanist Loredana Marcello died from the plague – but not before developing several effective palliative formulas for plague sufferers, which were used by many physicians.
1572: Danish scientist Sophia Brahe (1556–1643) assisted her brother Tycho Brahe with his astronomical observations.
1590: After her husband's death, Caterina Vitale took over his position as chief pharmacist to the Order of St John, becoming the first woman chemist and pharmacist in Malta.

17th century 

 1609: French midwife Louise Bourgeois Boursier became the first woman to write a book on childbirth practices.
 1636: Anna Maria van Schurman is the first woman ever to attend university lectures. She had to sit behind a screen so that her male fellow students would not see her.
 1642: Martine Bertereau, the first recorded woman mineralogist, was imprisoned in France on suspicion of witchcraft. Bertereau had published two written works on the science of mining and metallurgy before being arrested.
1650: Silesian astronomer Maria Cunitz published Urania Propitia, a work that both simplified and substantially improved Johannes Kepler's mathematical methods for locating planets. The book was published in both Latin and German, an unconventional decision that made the scientific text more accessible for non-university educated readers.
1656: French chemist and alchemist Marie Meurdrac published her book La Chymie Charitable et Facile, en Faveur des Dames (Useful and Easy Chemistry, for the Benefit of Ladies).
1667: Margaret Lucas Cavendish, Duchess of Newcastle upon Tyne (1623 – 15 December 1673) was an English aristocrat, philosopher, poet, scientist, fiction-writer, and playwright during the 17th century. She was the first woman to attend a meeting at the Royal Society of London, in 1667, and she criticised and engaged with members and philosophers Thomas Hobbes, René Descartes, and Robert Boyle.
1668: After separating  from her husband, French polymath Marguerite de la Sablière established a popular salon in Paris. Scientists and scholars from different countries visited the salon regularly to discuss ideas and share knowledge, and Sablière studied physics, astronomy and natural history with her guests.
1680: French astronomer Jeanne Dumée published a summary of arguments supporting the Copernican theory of heliocentrism. She wrote "between the brain of a woman and that of a man there is no difference".
1685: Frisian poet and archaeologist Titia Brongersma supervised the first excavation of a dolmen in Borger, Netherlands. The excavation produced new evidence that the stone structures were graves constructed by prehistoric humans – rather than structures built by giants, which had been the prior common belief.
1690: German-Polish astronomer Elisabetha Koopman Hevelius, widow of Johannes Hevelius, whom she had assisted with his observations (and, probably, computations) for over twenty years, published in his name Prodromus Astronomiae, the largest and most accurate star catalog to that date.
1693–1698: German astronomer and illustrator Maria Clara Eimmart created more than 350 detailed drawings of the moon phases.
1699: German entomologist Maria Sibylla Merian, the first scientist to document the life cycle of insects for the public, embarked on a scientific expedition to Suriname, South America. She subsequently published Metamorphosis insectorum Surinamensium, a groundbreaking illustrated work on South American plants, animals and insects.

18th century 

 1702: Pioneering English entomologist Eleanor Glanville captured a butterfly specimen in Lincolnshire, which was subsequently named the Glanville fritillary in her honour. Her extensive butterfly collection impressed fellow entomologist William Vernon, who called Glanville's work "the noblest collection of butterflies, all English, which has sham'd us". Her butterfly specimens became part of early collections in the Natural History Museum.
1702: German astronomer Maria Kirch became the first woman to discover a comet.
c. 1702–1744: In Montreal, Canada, French botanist Catherine Jérémie collected plant specimens and studied their properties, sending the specimens and her detailed notes back to scientists in France.
1732: At the age of 20, Italian physicist Laura Bassi became the first female member of the Bologna Academy of Sciences. One month later, she publicly defended her academic theses and received a PhD. Bassi was awarded an honorary position as professor of physics at the University of Bologna. She was the first female physics professor in the world.
1738: French polymath Émilie du Châtelet became the first woman to have a paper published by the Paris Academy, following a contest on the nature of fire.
1740: French polymath Émilie du Châtelet published Institutions de Physique (Foundations of Physics) providing a metaphysical basis for Newtonian physics.
1748: Swedish agronomist Eva Ekeblad became the first woman member of the Royal Swedish Academy of Sciences. Two years earlier, she had developed a new process of using potatoes to make flour and alcohol, which subsequently lessened Sweden's reliance on wheat crops and decreased the risk of famine.
1751: 19-year-old Italian physicist Cristina Roccati received her PhD from the University of Bologna.
1753: Jane Colden, an American, was the only female biologist mentioned by Carl Linnaeus in his masterwork Species Plantarum.
1755: After the death of her husband, Italian anatomist Anna Morandi Manzolini took his place at the University of Bologna, becoming a professor of anatomy and establishing an internationally known laboratory for anatomical research.
1757: French astronomer Nicole-Reine Lepaute worked with mathematicians Alexis Clairaut and Joseph Lalande to calculate the next arrival of Halley's Comet.
1760: American horticulturalist Martha Daniell Logan began corresponding with botanic specialist and collector John Bartram, regularly exchanging seeds, plants and botanical knowledge with him.
1762: French astronomer Nicole-Reine Lepaute calculated the time and percentage of a solar eclipse that had been predicted to occur in two years time. She created a map to show the phases, and published a table of her calculations in the 1763 edition of Connaissance des Temps.
1766: French chemist Geneviève Thiroux d'Arconville published her study on putrefaction. The book presented her observations from more than 300 experiments over the span of five years, during which she attempted to discover factors necessary for the preservation of beef, eggs, and other foods. Her work was recommended for royal privilege by fellow chemist Pierre-Joseph Macquer.
c. 1775:  Herbalist/botanist Jeanne Baret becomes the first woman to circumnavigate the globe. 
1776: At the University of Bologna, Italian physicist Laura Bassi became the first woman appointed as chair of physics at a university.
1776: Christine Kirch received a respectable salary of 400 Thaler for calendar-making. See also her sister Margaretha Kirch
1782–1791: French chemist and mineralogist Claudine Picardet translated more than 800 pages of Swedish, German, English and Italian scientific papers into French, enabling French scientists to better discuss and utilize international research in chemistry, mineralogy and astronomy.

c. 1787–1797: Self-taught Chinese astronomer Wang Zhenyi published at least twelve books and multiple articles on astronomy and mathematics. Using a lamp, a mirror and a table, she once created a famous scientific exhibit designed to accurately simulate a lunar eclipse.
1786–1797: German astronomer Caroline Herschel discovered eight new comets, along with numerous other discoveries.
1789: French astronomer Louise du Pierry, the first Parisian woman to become an astronomy professor, taught the first astronomy courses specifically open to female students.
1794: British chemist Elizabeth Fulhame invented the concept of catalysis and published a book on her findings.
c. 1796–1820: During the reign of the Jiaqing Emperor, astronomer Huang Lü became the first Chinese woman to work with optics and photographic images. She developed a telescope that could take simple photographic images using photosensitive paper.
1797: English science writer and schoolmistress Margaret Bryan published A Compendious System of Astronomy, including an engraving of herself and her two daughters. She dedicated the book to her students.

Early 19th century

1808: Anna Sundström began assisting Jacob Berzelius in his laboratory, becoming one of the first Swedish women chemists.
1809: Sabina Baldoncelli earned her university degree in pharmacy but was allowed to work only in the Italian orphanage where she resided.
1815: English archaeologist Lady Hester Stanhope used a medieval Italian manuscript to locate a promising archaeological site in Ashkelon, becoming the first archaeologist to begin an excavation in the Palestinian region. It was one of the earliest examples of the use of textual sources in field archaeology.
1816: French mathematician and physicist Sophie Germain became the first woman to win a prize from the Paris Academy of Sciences for her work on elasticity theory.
1823: English palaeontologist and fossil collector Mary Anning discovered the first complete Plesiosaurus.
1831: Italian botanist Elisabetta Fiorini Mazzanti published her best-known work Specimen Bryologiae Romanae.
1830–1837: Belgian botanist Marie-Anne Libert published her four-volume Plantae cryptogamicae des Ardennes, a collection of 400 species of mosses, ferns, lichen, algae and fungi from the Ardennes region. Her contributions to systemic cryptogamic studies were formally recognized by Prussian emperor Friedrich Wilhelm III, and Libert received a gold medal of merit.
1832: French marine biologist Jeanne Villepreux-Power invented the first glass aquarium, using it to assist in her scientific observations of Argonauta argo. 
1833: English phycologists Amelia Griffiths and Mary Wyatt published two books on local British seaweeds. Griffiths had an internationally respected reputation as a skilled seaweed collector and scholar, and Swedish botanist Carl Agardh had earlier named the seaweed genus Griffithsia in her honour.
1833 Orra White Hitchcock (March 8, 1796 – May 26, 1863) was one of America's earliest women botanical and scientific illustrators and artists, best known for illustrating the scientific works of her husband, geologist Edward Hitchcock (1793–1864), but also notable for her own artistic and scientific work. The most well known appear in her husband's seminal works, the 1833 Report on the Geology, Mineralogy, Botany, and Zoology of Massachusetts and its successor, the 1841 Final Report produced when he was State Geologist.  For the 1833 edition, Pendleton's Lithography (Boston) lithographed nine of Hitchcock's Connecticut River Valley drawings and printed them as plates for the work.  In 1841, B. W. Thayer and Co., Lithographers (Boston) printed revised lithographs and an additional plate.  The hand-colored plate "Autumnal Scenery. View in Amherst"  is Hitchcock's most frequently seen work.
1835: Scottish polymath Mary Somerville and German astronomer Caroline Herschel were elected the first female members of the Royal Astronomical Society.
1836: Early English geologist and paleontologist Etheldred Benett, known for her extensive collection of several thousand fossils, was appointed a member of the Imperial Natural History Society of Moscow. The society – which only admitted men at the time – initially mistook Benett for a man due to her reputation as a scientist and her unusual first name, addressing her diploma of admission to "Dominum" (Master) Benett.
1840: Scottish fossil collector and illustrator Lady Eliza Maria Gordon-Cumming invited geologists Louis Agassiz, William Buckland and Roderick Murchison to examine her collection of fish fossils. Agassiz confirmed several of Gordon-Cumming's discoveries as new species.
1843: During a nine-month period in 1842–43, English mathematician Ada Lovelace translated Luigi Menabrea's article on Charles Babbage's newest proposed machine, the Analytical Engine. With the article, she appended a set of notes. Her notes were labelled alphabetically from A to G. In note G, she describes an algorithm for the Analytical Engine to compute Bernoulli numbers. It is considered the first published algorithm ever specifically tailored for implementation on a computer, and Ada Lovelace has often been cited as the first computer programmer for this reason. The engine was never completed, so her program was never tested.
1843: British botanist and pioneering photographer Anna Atkins self-published her book Photographs of British Algae, illustrating the work with cyanotypes. Her book was the first book on any subject to be illustrated by photographs.
1846: British zoologist Anna Thynne built the first stable, self-sustaining marine aquarium.
 1848: American astronomer Maria Mitchell became the first woman elected to the American Academy of Arts and Sciences; she had discovered a new comet the year before.
1848–1849: English scientist Mary Anne Whitby, a pioneer in western silkworm cultivation, collaborated with Charles Darwin in researching the hereditary qualities of silkworms.
1850: The American Association for the Advancement of Sciences accepted its first women members: astronomer Maria Mitchell, entomologist Margaretta Morris, and science educator Almira Hart Lincoln Phelps.

Late 19th century

 1854: Mary Horner Lyell was a conchologist and geologist. She is most well known for her scientific work in 1854, where she studied her collection of land snails from the Canary Islands. She was married to the notable British geologist Charles Lyell and assisted him in his scientific work. It is believed by historians that she likely made major contributions to her husband's work.
 1854–1855: Florence Nightingale organized care for wounded soldiers during the Crimean War. She was an English social reformer and statistician, and the founder of modern nursing. Her pie charts clearly showed that most deaths resulted from disease rather than battle wounds or "other causes," which led the general public to demand improved sanitation at field hospitals.
 1855: Working with her father, Welsh astronomer and photographer Thereza Dillwyn Llewelyn produced some of the earliest photographs of the moon.
1856: American atmospheric scientist Eunice Newton Foote presented her paper "Circumstances affecting the heat of the sun's rays" at an annual meeting of the American Association for the Advancement of Sciences. She was an early researcher of the greenhouse effect.
1862: Belgian botanist Marie-Anne Libert became the first woman to join the Royal Botanical Society of Belgium. She was named an honorary member.
1863: German naturalist Amalie Dietrich arrived in Australia to collect plant, animal and anthropological specimens for the German Godeffroy Museum. She remained in Australia for the next decade, discovering a number of new plant and animal species in the process, but also became notorious in later years for her removal of Aboriginal skeletons – and the possible incitement of violence against Aboriginal people – for anthropological research purposes.
1865: English geologist Elizabeth Carne was elected the first female Fellow of the Royal Geological Society of Cornwall.

1870s
1869/1870: American beekeeper Ellen Smith Tupper became the first female editor of an entomological journal.
 1870: Katharine Murray Lyell was a British botanist, author of an early book on the worldwide distribution of ferns, and editor of volumes of the correspondence of several of the era's notable scientists.<ref>{{cite book|title=Katharine Lyell. A Geographical Handbook of All the Known Ferns: With Tables to Show Their Distribution|author= Katharine Lyell|publisher=John Murray|year=1870}}</ref>
 1870: Ellen Swallow Richards became the first American woman to earn a degree in chemistry.
1870: Russian chemist Anna Volkova became the first woman member of the Russian Chemical Society.
1874: Julia Lermontova became the first Russian woman to receive a PhD in chemistry.
1875: Hungarian archaeologist Zsófia Torma excavated the site of Turdaș-Luncă in Hunedoara County, today in Romania. The site, which uncovered valuable prehistoric artifacts, became one of the most important archaeological discoveries in Europe.
1876–1878: American naturalist Mary Treat studied insectivorous plants in Florida. Her contributions to the scientific understanding of how these plants caught and digested prey were acknowledged by Charles Darwin and Asa Gray.
1878: English entomologist Eleanor Anne Ormerod became the first female Fellow of the Royal Meteorological Society. A few years afterwards, she was appointed as Consulting Entomologist to the Royal Agricultural Society.

1880s
 1880: Self-taught German chemist Agnes Pockels began investigating surface tension, becoming a pioneering figure in the field of surface science. The measurement equipment she developed provided the basic foundation for modern quantitative analyses of surface films.
1883: American ethnologist Erminnie A. Smith, the first woman field ethnographer, published her collection of Iroquois legends Myths of the Iroquois.
1884: English zoologist Alice Johnson's paper on newt embryos became the first paper authored by a woman to appear in the Proceedings of the Royal Society.
1885: British naturalist Marian Farquharson became the first female Fellow of the Royal Microscopical Society.
1886: Botanist Emily Lovira Gregory became the first woman member of the American Society of Naturalists.
1887: Rachel Lloyd became the first American woman to receive a PhD in chemistry, completing her research at the Swiss University of Zurich.
1888: Russian scientist Sofia Kovalevskaya discovered the Kovalevskaya top, one of a brief list of known rigid body motion examples that are tractable by manipulating equations by hand.E. T. Whittaker, A Treatise on the Analytical Dynamics of Particles and Rigid Bodies, Cambridge University Press (1952).
1888: American chemist Josephine Silone Yates was appointed head of the Department of Natural Sciences at Lincoln Institute (later Lincoln University), becoming the first black woman to head a college science department.
 1889: Geologist Mary Emilie Holmes became the first female Fellow of the Geological Society of America.

1890s
1890: Austrian-born chemist Ida Freund became the first woman to work as a university chemistry lecturer in the United Kingdom. She was promoted to full lecturer at Newnham College, Cambridge.
1890: Popular science educator and author Agnes Giberne co-founded the British Astronomical Association. Subsequently, English astronomer Elizabeth Brown was appointed the Director of the association's Solar Section, well known for her studies in sunspots and other solar phenomena.
1890: Mathematician Philippa Fawcett became the first woman to obtain the highest score in the Cambridge Mathematical Tripos examinations, a score "above the Senior Wrangler".  (At the time, women were ineligible to be named Senior Wrangler.)
1891: American-born astronomer Dorothea Klumpke was appointed as Head of the Bureau of Measurements at the Paris Observatory. For the next decade, in addition to completing her doctorate of science, she worked on the Carte du Ciel mapping project. She was recognized for her work with the first Prix de Dames award from the Société astronomique de France and named an Officier of the Paris Academy of Sciences.
1892: American psychologist Christine Ladd-Franklin presented her evolutionary theory on the development of colour vision to the International Congress of Psychology. Her theory was the first to emphasize colour vision as an evolutionary trait.
 1893: Florence Bascom became the second woman to earn her PhD in geology in the United States, and the first woman to receive a PhD from Johns Hopkins University. Geologists consider her to be the "first woman geologist in this country (America)".
1893: American botanist Elizabeth Gertrude Britton became a charter member of the Botanical Society of America.
1894: American astronomer Margaretta Palmer becomes the first woman to earn a doctorate in astronomy.
1895: English physiologist Marion Bidder became the first woman to speak and present her own paper at a meeting of the Royal Society.
 1896: Florence Bascom became the first woman to work for the United States Geological Survey.
1896: English mycologist and lichenologist Annie Lorrain Smith became a founding member of the British Mycological Society. She later served as president twice.
1897: American cytologists and zoologists Katharine Foot and Ella Church Strobell started working as research partners. Together, they pioneered the practice of photographing microscopic research samples and invented a new technique for creating thin material samples in colder temperatures.
1897: American physicist Isabelle Stone became the first woman to receive a PhD in physics in the United States. She wrote her dissertation "On the Electrical Resistance of Thin Films" at the University of Chicago.
1898: Danish physicist Kirstine Meyer was awarded the gold medal of the Royal Danish Academy of Sciences and Letters.
1898: Italian malacologist Marianna Paulucci donated her collection of specimens to the Royal Museum of Natural History in Florence, Italy (Museo di Storia Naturale di Firenze). Paulucci was the first scientist to compile and publish a species list of Italian malacofauna.
1899: American physicists Marcia Keith and Isabelle Stone became charter members of the American Physical Society.
1899: Irish physicist Edith Anne Stoney was appointed a physics lecturer at the London School of Medicine for Women, becoming the first woman medical physicist. She later became a pioneering figure in the use of X-ray machines on the front lines of World War I.

Early 20th century

 1900s 

1900: American botanist Anna Murray Vail became the first librarian of the New York Botanical Garden. A key supporter of the institution's establishment, she had earlier donated her entire collection of 3000 botanical specimens to the garden.
1900: Physicists Marie Skłodowska–Curie and Isabelle Stone attended the first International Congress of Physics in Paris, France. They were the only two women out of 836 participants.
1901: American Florence Bascom became the first female geologist to present a paper before the Geological Survey of Washington. 
1901: Czech botanist and zoologist Marie Zdeňka Baborová-Čiháková became the first woman in the Czech Republic to receive a PhD.
 1901: American astronomer Annie Jump Cannon published her first catalog of stellar spectra, which classified stars by temperature. This method was universally and permanently adopted by other astronomers.
 1903: Grace Coleridge Frankland née  Toynbee  was an English microbiologist. Her most notable work was Bacteria in Daily Life. She was one of the nineteen female scientists who wrote the 1904 petition to the Chemical Society to request that they should create some female fellows of the society.
 1903: Polish-born physicist and chemist Marie Skłodowska–Curie became the first woman to receive a Nobel Prize when she received the Nobel Prize in Physics along with her husband, Pierre Curie, "for their joint researches on the radiation phenomena discovered by Professor Henri Becquerel", and Henri Becquerel, "for his discovery of spontaneous radioactivity".
1904: American geographer, geologist and educator Zonia Baber published her article "The Scope of Geography", in which she laid out her educational theories on the teaching of geography. She argued that students required a more interdisciplinary, experiential approach to learning geography: instead of a reliance on textbooks, students needed field-trips, lab work and map-making knowledge. Baber's educational ideas transformed the way schools taught geography.
1904: British chemists Ida Smedley, Ida Freund and Martha Whiteley organized a petition asking the Chemical Society to admit women as Fellows. A total of 19 female chemists became signatories, but their petition was denied by the society.
1904: Marie Charlotte Carmichael Stopes (15 October 1880 – 2 October 1958) was a British author, palaeobotanist and campaigner for women's rights. She made significant contributions to plant palaeontology and coal classification. She held the post of Lecturer in Palaeobotany at the University of Manchester from 1904 to 1910; in this capacity she became the first female academic of that university. In 1909 she was elected to the Linnean Society of London. She was 26 at the time of her election to Fellowship (the youngest woman admitted at that time).
1904: In a December meeting, the Linnean Society of London elected its first women Fellows. These initial women included horticulturalist Ellen Willmott, ornithologist Emma Turner, biologist Lilian Jane Gould, mycologists Gulielma Lister and Annie Lorrain Smith, and botanists Mary Anne Stebbing, Margaret Jane Benson and Ethel Sargant.
1905: American geneticist Nettie Stevens discovered sex chromosomes.
 1906: Following the San Francisco earthquake, American botanist and curator Alice Eastwood rescued almost 1500 rare plant specimens from the burning California Academy of Sciences building. Her curation system of keeping type specimens separate from other collections – unconventional at the time – allowed her to quickly find and retrieve the specimens.
1906: Russian chemist Irma Goldberg published a paper on two newly discovered chemical reactions involving the presence of copper and the creation of a nitrogen-carbon bond to an aromatic halide. These reactions were subsequently named the Goldberg reaction and the Jourdan-Ullman-Goldberg reaction.
1906: English physicist, mathematician and engineer Hertha Ayrton became the first female recipient of the Hughes Medal from the Royal Society of London. She received the award for her experimental research on electric arcs and sand ripples.
1906: After her death, English lepidopterist Emma Hutchinson's collection of 20,000 butterflies and moths was donated to the London Natural History Museum. She had published little during her lifetime, and was barred from joining local scientific societies due to her gender, but was honoured for her work when a variant form of the comma butterfly was named hutchinsoni.
 1909: Alice Wilson became the first female geologist hired by the Geological Survey of Canada. She is widely credited as being the first Canadian woman geologist.
1909: Danish physicist Kirstine Meyer became the first Danish woman to receive a doctorate degree in natural sciences. She wrote her dissertation on the topic of "the development of the temperature concept" within the history of physics.

 1910s 

1911: Polish-born physicist and chemist Marie Curie became the first woman to receive the Nobel Prize in Chemistry, which she received "[for] the discovery of the elements radium and polonium, by the isolation of radium and the study of the nature and compounds of this remarkable element".  This made her the first person ever to win the Nobel Prize twice.  As of 2022, she is the only woman to win it twice and the only person to win the Nobel Prize in two scientific fields.
1911: Norwegian biologist Kristine Bonnevie became the first woman member of the Norwegian Academy of Science and Letters.
 1912: American astronomer Henrietta Swan Leavitt studied the bright-dim cycle periods of Cepheid stars, then found a way to calculate the distance from such stars to Earth.
 1912: Canadian botanist and geneticist Carrie Derick was appointed a professor of morphological botany at McGill University. She was the first woman to become a full professor in any department at a Canadian university.
1913: Regina Fleszarowa became the first Polish woman to receive a PhD in natural sciences.
1913: Izabela Textorisová, the first Slovakian woman botanist, published "Flora Data from the County of Turiec" in the journal Botanikai Közlemények. Her work uncovered more than 100 previously unknown species of plants from the Turiec area.
 1913: Canadian physician and chemist Maud Menten co-authored a paper on enzyme kinetics, leading to the development of the Michaelis–Menten kinetics equation.
1914–1918: During World War I, a team of seven British women chemists conducted pioneering research on chemical antidotes and weaponized gases. The project leader, Martha Whiteley, was awarded the Order of the British Empire for her wartime contributions.
1914-1918: Dame Helen Gwynne-Vaughan,   (née Fraser) was a prominent English botanist and mycologist. For her wartime service she was the first woman to be awarded a military DBE in January 1918. She served as Commandant of the Women's Royal Air Force (WRAF) from September 1918 until December 1919.
 1914: British-born mycologist Ethel Doidge became the first woman in South Africa to receive a doctorate in any subject, receiving her doctorate of science degree from the University of the Good Hope. She wrote her thesis on "A bacterial disease of mango".
 1916: Isabella Preston became the first female professional plant hybridist in Canada, producing the George C. Creelman trumpet lily. Her lily later received an Award of Merit from the Royal Horticultural Society.
 1916: Chika Kuroda became the first Japanese woman to earn a bachelor of science degree, studying chemistry at the Tohoku Imperial University. After graduation, she was subsequently appointed an assistant professor at the university.
1917: American zoologist Mary J. Rathbun received her PhD from the George Washington University. Despite never having attended college – or any formal schooling beyond high school – Rathbun had authored more than 80 scientific publications, described over 674 new species of crustacean, and developed a system for crustacean-related records at the Smithsonian Museum.
1917: Dutch biologist and geneticist Jantina Tammes became the first female university professor in the Netherlands. She was appointed an extraordinary professor of phytopathology at the University of Utrecht.
 1918: German physicist and mathematician Emmy Noether created Noether's theorem explaining the connection between symmetry and conservation laws.
 1919: Kathleen Maisey Curtis became the first New Zealand woman to earn a Doctorate of Science degree (DSc), completing her thesis on Synchytrium endobioticum (potato wart disease) at the Imperial College of Science and Technology. Her research was cited as "the most outstanding result in mycological research that had been presented for ten years".

 1920s 

 1920: Louisa Bolus was elected a Fellow of the Royal Society of South Africa for her contributions to botany. Over the course of her lifetime, Bolus identified and named more than 1,700 new South African plant species – more species than any other botanist in South Africa.
 1923: María Teresa Ferrari, an Argentine physician, earned the first diploma awarded to a woman by the Faculty of Medicine at the University of Paris for her studies of the urinary tract.
 1924: Florence Bascom became the first woman elected to the Council of the Geological Society of America.
1925: Mexican-American botanist Ynes Mexia embarked on her first botanical expedition into Mexico, collecting over 1500 plant specimens. Over the course of the next thirteen years, Mexia collected more than 145,000 specimens from Mexico, Alaska, and multiple South American countries. She discovered 500 new species.
 1925: American medical scientist Florence Sabin became the first woman elected to the National Academy of Sciences.
 1925: British-American astronomer and astrophysicist Cecilia Payne-Gaposchkin established that hydrogen is the most common element in stars, and thus the most abundant element in the universe.
 1927: Kono Yasui became the first Japanese woman to earn a doctorate in science, studying at the Tokyo Imperial University and completing her thesis on "Studies on the structure of lignite, brown coal, and bituminous coal in Japan".
 1928: Alice Evans became the first woman elected president of the Society of American Bacteriologists.
 1928: Helen Battle became the first woman to earn a PhD in marine biology in Canada.
 1928: British biologist Kathleen Carpenter published the first English-language textbook devoted to freshwater ecology: Life in Inland Waters.
1929: American botanist Margaret Clay Ferguson became the first woman president of the Botanical Society of America. 
1929: Scottish-Nigerian Agnes Yewande Savage became the first West African woman to graduate from medical school, obtaining her degree at the University of Edinburgh.

 1930s 

 1930: Concepción Mendizábal Mendoza became the first woman in Mexico to earn a civil engineering degree.
1932: Michiyo Tsujimura became the first Japanese woman to earn a doctorate in agriculture. She studied at the Tokyo Imperial University, and her doctoral thesis was entitled "On the Chemical Components of Green Tea".
 1933: Hungarian scientist Elizabeth Rona received the Haitinger Prize from the Austrian Academy of Sciences for her method of extracting polonium.
1933: American bacteriologist Ruth Ella Moore became the first African-American woman to receive a PhD in the natural sciences, completing her doctorate in bacteriology at Ohio State University.
 1935: French chemist Irène Joliot-Curie received the Nobel Prize in Chemistry along with Frédéric Joliot-Curie "for their synthesis of new radioactive elements".
1935: American plant hybridist Grace Sturtevant, the "First Lady of Iris", received the American Iris Society's gold medal for her lifetime's work.
 1936: Edith Patch became the first female president of the Entomological Society of America.
 1936: Mycologist Kathleen Maisey Curtis was elected the first female Fellow at the Royal Society of New Zealand.
 1936: Danish seismologist and geophysicist Inge Lehmann discovered that the Earth has a solid inner core distinct from its molten outer core.
 1937: Canadian forensic pathologist Frances Gertrude McGill assisted the Royal Canadian Mounted Police in establishing their first forensic detection laboratory.
1937: Suzanne Comhaire-Sylvain became the first female Haitian anthropologist and the first Haitian person to complete a PhD, receiving her doctoral degree from the University of Paris.
 1937: Marietta Blau and her student Hertha Wambacher, both Austrian physicists, received the Lieben Prize of the Austrian Academy of Sciences for their work on cosmic ray observations using the technique of nuclear emulsions.
1938: Elizabeth Abimbola Awoliyi became the first woman to be licensed to practise medicine in Nigeria after graduating from the University of Dublin and the first West African female medical officer with a license of the Royal Surgeon (Dublin).
1938: Geologist Alice Wilson became the first woman appointed as Fellow to the Royal Society of Canada.
 1938: South African naturalist Marjorie Courtenay-Latimer discovered a living coelacanth fish caught near the Chalumna river. The species had been believed to be extinct for over 60 million years. It was named latimeria chalumnae in her honour.
 1939: Austrian-Swedish physicist Lise Meitner, along with Otto Hahn, led the small group of scientists who first discovered nuclear fission of uranium when it absorbed an extra neutron; the results were published in early 1939.Frisch, O. R. (1939). "Physical Evidence for the Division of Heavy Nuclei under Neutron Bombardment". Nature. 143 (3616): 276. Bibcode:1939Natur.143..276F. doi:10.1038/143276a0. [The experiment for this letter to the editor was conducted on 13 January 1939; see Richard Rhodes, The Making of the Atomic Bomb pp. 263, 268 (Simon and Schuster, 1986).]
 1939: French physicist Marguerite Perey discovered francium.

 1940s 

1940: Turkish Archaeologist, Sumerologist, Assyriologist, and writer Muazzez İlmiye Çığ. Upon receiving her degree in 1940, she began a multi-decade career at Museum of the Ancient Orient, one of three such institutions comprising Istanbul Archaeology Museums, as a resident specialist in the field of cuneiform tablets, thousands of which were being stored untranslated and unclassified in the facility's archives. In the intervening years, due to her efforts in the deciphering and publication of the tablets, the Museum became a Middle Eastern languages learning center attended by ancient history researchers from every part of the world.
1941: American scientist Ruth Smith Lloyd became the first African-American woman to receive a PhD in anatomy.
 1942: Austrian-American actress and inventor Hedy Lamarr and composer George Antheil developed a radio guidance system for Allied torpedoes that used spread spectrum and frequency hopping technology to defeat the threat of jamming by the Axis powers. Although the US Navy did not adopt the technology until the 1960s, the principles of their work are incorporated into Bluetooth technology and are similar to methods used in legacy versions of CDMA and Wi-Fi. This work led to their induction into the National Inventors Hall of Fame in 2014.
 1942: American geologist Marguerite Williams became the first African-American woman to receive a PhD in geology in the United States. She completed her doctorate, entitled A History of Erosion in the Anacostia Drainage Basin, at Catholic University.
 1942: Native American aerospace engineer Mary Golda Ross became employed at Lockheed Aircraft Corporation, where she provided troubleshooting for military aircraft. She went on to work for NASA, developing operational requirements, flight plans, and a Planetary Flight Handbook for spacecraft missions such as the Apollo program.
 1943: British geologist Eileen Guppy was promoted to the rank of assistant geologist, therefore becoming the first female geology graduate appointed to the scientific staff of the British Geological Survey.
1944: Indian chemist Asima Chatterjee became the first Indian woman to receive a doctorate of science, completing her studies at the University of Calcutta. She went on to establish the Department of Chemistry at Lady Brabourne College.
1945: American physicists and mathematicians Frances Spence, Ruth Teitelbaum, Marlyn Meltzer, Betty Holberton, Jean Bartik and Kathleen Antonelli programmed the electronic general-purpose computer ENIAC, becoming some of the world's first computer programmers. (The first were uncredited operators, mostly members of the Women's Royal Naval Service, of the Colossus computer in 1943–1945, but that machine was not a stored-program computer and its existence was a state secret until the 1970s.)
1945: Marjory Stephenson and Kathleen Lonsdale were elected as the first female Fellows of the Royal Society.
 1947: Austrian-American biochemist Gerty Cori became the first woman to receive the Nobel Prize in Physiology or Medicine, which she received along with Carl Ferdinand Cori "for their discovery of the course of the catalytic conversion of glycogen", and Bernardo Alberto Houssay "for his discovery of the part played by the hormone of the anterior pituitary lobe in the metabolism of sugar".
1947: American biochemist Marie Maynard Daly became the first African-American woman to complete a PhD in chemistry in the United States. She completed her dissertation, entitled "A Study of the Products Formed by the Action of Pancreatic Amylase on Corn Starch" at Columbia University.
 1947: Berta Karlik, an Austrian physicist, was awarded the Haitinger Prize of the Austrian Academy of Sciences for her discovery of astatine.
1947: Susan Ofori-Atta became the first Ghanaian woman to earn a medical degree when she graduated from the University of Edinburgh.
 1948: Canadian plant pathologist and mycologist Margaret Newton became the first woman to be awarded the Flavelle Medal from the Royal Society of Canada, in recognition of her extensive research in wheat rust fungal disease. Her experiments led to the development of rust-resistant strains of wheat.
 1948: American limnologist Ruth Patrick of the Academy of Natural Sciences of Philadelphia led a multidisciplinary team of scientists on an extensive pollution survey of the Conestoga River watershed in Pennsylvania. Patrick would become a leading authority on the ecological effects of river pollution, receiving the Tyler Prize for Environmental Achievement in 1975.
1949: Botanist  became the first Azerbaijani woman to receive a PhD in biological studies. She went on to write the first national Azerbaijani-language textbooks on botany and biology.
Winifred Goldring (February 1, 1888 – January 30, 1971), was an American paleontologist and became the first woman president of the Paleontological Society, her  work included a description of stromatolites, as well as the study of Devonian crinoids. and   She was the first woman in the US to be appointed as a State Paleontologist.

 Late 20th century 

 1950s 

 1950s: Chinese-American medical scientist Tsai-Fan Yu co-founded a clinic at Mount Sinai Medical Center for the study and treatment of gout. Working with Alexander B. Gutman, Yu established that levels of uric acid were a factor in the pain experienced by gout patients, and subsequently developed multiple effective drugs for the treatment of gout.
 1950: Chinese-American particle physicist Chien-Shiung Wu proved the validity of Quantum entanglement which counters Albert Einstein's EPR Paradox and published her work on the new year of the new decade. She also proved the validity of beta decay around this time.
 1950: Ghanaian, Matilda J. Clerk became the first woman in Ghana and West Africa to attend graduate school, earning a postgraduate diploma at the London School of Hygiene & Tropical Medicine.
 1950: Isabella Abbott became the first Native Hawaiian woman to receive a PhD in any science; hers was in botany.
 1950: American microbiologist Esther Lederberg became the first to isolate lambda bacteriophage, a DNA virus, from Escherichia coli K-12.
1951: Ghana's Esther Afua Ocloo became the first person of African ancestry to obtain a cooking diploma from the Good Housekeeping Institute in London and to take the post-graduate Food Preservation Course at Long Ashton Research Station, Department of Horticulture, Bristol University.
 1952: American computer scientist Grace Hopper completed what is considered to be the first compiler, a program that allows a computer user to use a human-readable high-level programming language instead of machine code. It was known as the A-0 compiler.
 1952: Photograph 51, an X-ray diffraction image of crystallized DNA, was taken by Raymond Gosling in May 1952, working as a PhD student under the supervision of British chemist and biophysicist Rosalind Franklin; it was critical evidence in identifying the structure of DNA.
 1952: Canadian agriculturalist Mary MacArthur became the first female Fellow of the Agricultural Institute of Canada for her contributions to the science of food dehydration and freezing.
 1953: Canadian-British radiobiologist Alma Howard co-authored a paper proposing that cellular life transitions through four distinct periods. This became the first concept of the cell cycle.
 1954: Lucy Cranwell was the first female recipient of the Hector Medal from the Royal Society of New Zealand. She was recognized for her pioneering work with pollen in the emerging field of palynology.
 1955: Moira Dunbar became the first female glaciologist to study sea ice from a Canadian icebreaker ship.
 1955: Japanese geochemist Katsuko Saruhashi published her research on measuring carbonic acid levels in seawater. The paper included "Saruhashi's Table", a tool of measurement she had developed that focused on using water temperature, pH level, and chlorinity to determine carbonic acid levels. Her work contributed to global understanding of climate change, and Saruhashi's Table was used by oceanographers for the next 30 years.
1955–1956: Soviet marine biologist Maria Klenova became the first woman scientist to work in the Antarctic, conducting research and assisting in the establishment of the Mirny Antarctic station.
1956: Canadian zoologist and feminist Anne Innis Dagg began pioneering behavioural research on wild giraffes in South Africa in Kruger National Park. She researched and published on feminism and anti-nepotism laws at academic institutions in North America.
 1956: Chinese-American physicist Chien-Shiung Wu conducted a nuclear physics experiment in collaboration with the Low Temperature Group of the US National Bureau of Standards. It was an important foundation for the Standard Model in particle physics and brought the first answer to the question of the universe's existence by virtue of matter's predominance over antimatter. The experiment, becoming known as the Wu experiment, showed that parity could be violated in weak interaction. The Nobel Prize was given only to her male colleagues soon after the headlines of the discovery were released.
 1956: Dorothy Hill became the first Australian woman elected a Fellow of the Australian Academy of Science.
 1956: English zoologist and geneticist Margaret Bastock published the first evidence that a single gene could change behavior.
 1957–1958: Chinese scientist Lanying Lin produced China's first germanium and silicon mono-crystals, subsequently pioneering new techniques in semiconductor development.
 1959: Chinese astronomer Ye Shuhua led the development of the Joint Chinese Universal Time System, which became the Chinese national standard for measuring universal time.
 1959: Susan Ofori-Atta, the first Ghanaian woman physician, became a founding member of the Ghana Academy of Arts and Sciences.

 1960s 

 1960: British primatologist Jane Goodall began studying chimpanzees in Tanzania; her study of them continued for over 50 years. Her observations challenged previous ideas that only humans made tools and that chimpanzees had a basically vegetarian diet.
 Early 1960s: German-Canadian metallurgist Ursula Franklin studied levels of radioactive isotope strontium-90 that were appearing in the teeth of children as a side effect of nuclear weapons testing fallout. Her research influenced the Partial Nuclear Test Ban Treaty of 1963.
 1960s: American mathematician Katherine Johnson calculated flight paths at NASA for crewed space flights.
1961: Indian chemist Asima Chatterjee became the first female recipient of a Shanti Swarup Bhatnagar Prize. She was recognized in the Chemical Sciences category for her contributions to phytomedicine.
 1962: Rachel Louise Carson was an American marine biologist, author, and conservationist whose book Silent Spring and other writings are credited with advancing the global environmental movement.
 1962: South African botanist Margaret Levyns became the first woman president of the Royal Society of South Africa.
1962: French physicist Marguerite Perey became the first female Fellow elected to the Académie des Sciences.
1963: Elsa G. Vilmundardóttir became the first female Icelandic geologist, completing her studies at Stockholm University.
 1963: Maria Goeppert Mayer became the first American woman to receive a Nobel Prize in Physics; she shared the prize with J. Hans D. Jensen "for their discoveries concerning nuclear shell structure" and Eugene Paul Wigner "for his contributions to the theory of the atomic nucleus and the elementary particles, particularly through the discovery and application of fundamental symmetry principles".
 1964: American mathematician Irene Stegun completed the work which led to the publication of Handbook of Mathematical Functions, a widely used and widely cited reference work in applied mathematics.
 1964: British chemist Dorothy Crowfoot Hodgkin received the Nobel Prize in Chemistry "for her determinations by X-ray techniques of the structures of important biochemical substances".
1964: Scottish virologist June Almeida made the first identification of a human coronavirus.
 1965: Sister Mary Kenneth Keller became the first American woman to receive a Ph.D. in computer science. Her thesis was titled "Inductive Inference on Computer Generated Patterns".
 1966: Japanese immunologist Teruko Ishizaka, working with Kimishige Ishizaka, discovered the antibody class Immunoglobulin E (IgE).
 1967: British astrophysicist Jocelyn Bell Burnell co-discovered the first radio pulsars.
 1967: Sue Arnold became the first female British Geological Survey person to go to sea on a research vessel.
 1967: South African radiobiologist Tikvah Alper discovered that scrapie, an infectious brain disease affecting sheep, did not spread via DNA or RNA like a viral or bacterial disease. The discovery enabled scientists to better understand diseases caused by prions.
 1967: Yvonne Brill, a Canadian-American rocket and jet propulsion engineer, invented the hydrazine resistojet propulsion system.
 1968: Japanese pioneer of molecular biology Tsuneko Okazaki studied DNA replication and discovered Okazaki fragments.
 1969: Beris Cox became the first female paleontologist in the British Geological Survey.
1969: Ukrainian-born astronomer Svetlana Gerasimenko co-discovered the 67P/Churyumov–Gerasimenko comet.

 1970s 

 1970: Dorothy Hill became the first female president of the Australian Academy of Science.
1970: Samira Islam became the first Saudi Arabian person to earn a PhD in pharmacology.
 1970: Astronomer Vera Rubin published the first evidence for dark matter.
1970: Polish geologist Franciszka Szymakowska became widely known because of her unique and detailed geological drawings that are still used today.
1973: American physicist Anna Coble became the first African-American woman to receive a PhD in biophysics, completing her dissertation at University of Illinois.
1974: Dominican marine biologist Idelisa Bonnelly founded the Dominican Republic Academy of Science.
1975: Indian chemist Asima Chatterjee was elected the General President of the Indian Science Congress Association. She simultaneously became the first woman scientist ever elected a member of the congress.
1975: Indian geneticist Archana Sharma received the Shanti Swarup Bhatnagar Prize, the first female recipient in the Biological Sciences category.
 1975: Female officers of the British Geological Survey no longer had to resign upon getting married.
 1975: Chien-Shiung Wu became the first female president of the American Physical Society.
 1976: Filipino-American microbiologist Roseli Ocampo-Friedmann traveled to the Antarctic with Imre Friedmann and discovered micro-organisms living within the porous rock of the Ross Desert. These organisms – cryptoendoliths – were observed surviving extremely low temperatures and humidity, assisting scientific research into the possibility of life on Mars.
 1976: Margaret Burbidge was named the first female president of the American Astronomical Society.
 1977: American medical physicist Rosalyn Yalow received the Nobel Prize in Physiology or Medicine "for the development of radioimmunoassays of peptide hormones" along with Roger Guillemin and Andrew V. Schally who received it "for their discoveries concerning the peptide hormone production of the brain".
 1977:  Friederike Victoria Joy Adamson (née Gessner, 20 January 1910 – 3 January 1980) was a naturalist, artist and author. Her book, Born Free, an international bestseller, describes her experiences raising a lion cub named Elsa. It was made into an Academy Award-winning movie of the same name. In 1977, she was awarded the Austrian Cross of Honour for Science and Art.
 1977: The Association for Women Geoscientists was founded.
 1977: Argentine-Canadian scientist Veronica Dahl became the first graduate at Université d'Aix-Marseille II (and one of the first women in the world) to earn a PhD in artificial intelligence.
 1977: Canadian-American Elizabeth Stern published her research on the link between birth control pills – which contained high levels of estrogen at the time – and the increased risk of cervical cancer development in women. Her data helped pressure the pharmaceutical industry into providing safer contraceptive pills with lower hormone doses.
 1978: Anna Jane Harrison became the first female president of the American Chemical Society.
 1978: Mildred Cohn served as the first female president of the American Society for Biochemistry and Molecular Biology, then called the American Society of Biological Chemists.

 1980s 

 1980: Japanese geochemist Katsuko Saruhashi became the first woman elected to the Science Council of Japan.
 1980: Nigerian geophysicist Deborah Ajakaiye became the first woman in any West African country to be appointed a full professor of physics. Over the course of her scientific career, she became the first female Fellow elected to the Nigerian Academy of Science, and the first female dean of science in Nigeria.
 1981: Vera Rubin was the second woman astronomer elected to the National Academy of Science. Beginning her academic career as the sole undergraduate in astronomy at Vassar College, Rubin went on to graduate studies at Cornell University and Georgetown University, where she observed deviations from Hubble flow in galaxies and provided evidence for the existence of galactic superclusters.
1982: Nephrologist Leah Lowenstein became the first woman dean of a co-educational medical school in the United States.
1982: Janet Vida Watson FRS FGS (1923–1985) was a British geologist. She was a professor of Geology at Imperial College, London. A fellow of the Royal Society, she is well known for her contribution to the understanding of the Lewisian complex and as an author and co-author of several books. In 1982 she was elected President of the Geological Society of London, the first woman to occupy that position.
 1983: American cytogeneticist Barbara McClintock received the Nobel Prize in Physiology or Medicine for her discovery of genetic transposition; she was the first woman to receive that prize without sharing it, and the first American woman to receive any unshared Nobel Prize.
 1983: Brazilian agronomist Johanna Döbereiner became a founding Fellow of the World Academy of Sciences.
1983: Indian immunologist Indira Nath became the first woman scientist to receive the Shanti Swaroop Bhatnagar Award in the Medical Sciences category.
1983: Geologist Sudipta Sengupta and marine biologist Aditi Pant became the first Indian women to visit the Antarctic.
 1985: After identifying HIV as the cause of AIDS, Chinese-American virologist Flossie Wong-Staal became the first scientist to clone and genetically map the HIV virus, enabling the development of the first HIV blood screening tests.
 1986: Italian neurologist Rita Levi-Montalcini received the Nobel Prize in Physiology or Medicine, shared with Stanley Cohen, "for their discoveries of growth factors".
 1988: American biochemist and pharmacologist Gertrude B. Elion received the Nobel Prize in Physiology or Medicine along with James W. Black and George H. Hitchings "for their discoveries of important principles for drug treatment".
 1988: American scientist and inventor Patricia Bath (born 1942) became the first African-American to patent a medical device, namely the Laserphaco Probe for improving the use of lasers to remove cataracts.

 1990s 

 
 1991: Doris Malkin Curtis became the first woman president of the Geological Society of America.
1991: Indian geologist Sudipta Sengupta became the first woman scientist to receive the Shanti Swaroop Bhatnagar Award in the Earth Sciences category.
Helen Patricia Sharman, CMG, OBE, HonFRSC (born 30 May 1963) is a chemist who became the first British astronaut (and in particular, the first British cosmonaut) as well as the first woman to visit the Mir space station in May 1991. 
 1992: Mae Carol Jemison is an American engineer, physician, and former NASA astronaut. She became the first black woman to travel into space when she served as a mission specialist aboard the Space Shuttle Endeavour. Jemison joined NASA's astronaut corps in 1987 and was selected to serve for the STS-47 mission, during which she orbited the Earth for nearly eight days on September 12–20, 1992.
 1992: Edith M. Flanigen became the first woman awarded the Perkin Medal (widely considered the highest honor in American industrial chemistry) for her outstanding achievements in applied chemistry. The medal especially recognized her syntheses of aluminophosphate and silicoaluminophosphate molecular sieves as new classes of materials.
 1995: German biologist Christiane Nüsslein-Volhard received the Nobel Prize in Physiology or Medicine, shared with Edward B. Lewis and Eric F. Wieschaus, "for their discoveries concerning the genetic control of early embryonic development".
 1995: British geomorphologist Marjorie Sweeting published the first comprehensive Western account of China's karst, entitled Karst in China: its Geomorphology and Environment.''
 1995: Israeli-Canadian mathematical biologist Leah Keshet became the first woman president of the international Society for Mathematical Biology.
 1995: Jane Plant became the first female Deputy Director of the British Geological Survey.
1995: Inspectors from the United Nations Special Commission discovered that Iraqi microbiologist Rihab Taha, nicknamed "Dr. Germ", had been overseeing a secret 10-year biological warfare development program in Iraq.
 1996: American planetary scientist Margaret G. Kivelson led a team that discovered the first subsurface, saltwater ocean on an alien world, on the Jovian moon Europa.
 1997: Lithuanian-Canadian primatologist Birutė Galdikas received the Tyler Prize for Environmental Achievement for her research and rehabilitation work with orangutans. Her work with orangutans, eventually spanning over 30 years, was later recognized in 2014 as one of the longest continuous scientific studies of wild animals in history.
1997: Chilean astronomer María Teresa Ruiz discovered Kelu 1, one of the first observed brown dwarfs. In recognition of her discovery, she became the first woman to receive the Chilean National Prize for Exact Sciences.
1998: Nurse Fannie Gaston-Johansson became the first African-American woman tenured full professor at Johns Hopkins University.
 Late 1990s: Ethiopian-American chemist Sossina M. Haile developed the first solid acid fuel cell.

21st century

2000s
 2000: Venezuelan astrophysicist Kathy Vivas presented her discovery of approximately 100 "new and very distant" RR Lyrae stars, providing insight into the structure and history of the Milky Way galaxy.
 2003: American geophysicist Claudia Alexander oversaw the final stages of Project Galileo, a space exploration mission that ended at the planet Jupiter.
 2004: American biologist Linda B. Buck received the Nobel Prize in Physiology or Medicine along with Richard Axel "for their discoveries of odorant receptors and the organization of the olfactory system".
 2006: Chilean biochemist Cecilia Hidalgo Tapia became the first woman to receive the Chilean National Prize for Natural Sciences.
 2006: Chinese-American biochemist Yizhi Jane Tao led a team of researchers to become the first to map the atomic structure of Influenza A, contributing to antiviral research.
2006: Parasitologist Susan Lim became the first Malaysian scientist elected to the International Commission on Zoological Nomenclature.
 2006: Merieme Chadid became the first Moroccan person and the first female astronomer to travel to Antarctica, leading an international team of scientists in the installation of a major observatory in the South Pole.
 2006: American computer scientist Frances E. Allen won the Turing Award for "pioneering contributions to the theory and practice of optimizing compiler techniques that laid the foundation for modern optimizing compilers and automatic parallel execution". She was the first woman to win the award.
 2006: Canadian-American computer scientist Maria Klawe became the president of Harvey Mudd College.
 2007: Using satellite imagery, Egyptian geomorphologist Eman Ghoneim discovered traces of an 11,000-year-old mega lake in the Sahara Desert. The discovery shed light on the origins of the largest modern groundwater reservoir in the world.
 2007: Physicist Ibtesam Badhrees was the first Saudi Arabian woman to become a member of the European Organization for Nuclear Research (CERN).
 2008: French virologist Françoise Barré-Sinoussi received the Nobel Prize in Physiology or Medicine, shared with Harald zur Hausen and Luc Montagnier, "for their discovery of HIV, human immunodeficiency virus". 
2008: American-born Australian Penny Sackett became Australia's first female Chief Scientist.
 2008: American computer scientist Barbara Liskov won the Turing Award for "contributions to practical and theoretical foundations of programming language and system design, especially related to data abstraction, fault tolerance, and distributed computing".
 2009: American molecular biologist Carol W. Greider received the Nobel Prize in Physiology or Medicine along with Elizabeth H. Blackburn and Jack W. Szostak "for the discovery of how chromosomes are protected by telomeres and the enzyme telomerase".
 2009: Israeli crystallographer Ada E. Yonath, along with Venkatraman Ramakrishnan and Thomas A. Steitz, received the Nobel Prize in Chemistry "for studies of the structure and function of the ribosome".
 2009: Chinese geneticist Zeng Fanyi and her research team published their experiment results proving that induced pluripotent stem cells can be used to generate whole mammalian bodies – in this case, live mice.

2010s
 2010: Marcia McNutt became the first female director of the United States Geological Survey.
2011: Kazakhstani neuroscience student and computer hacker Alexandra Elbakyan launched Sci-Hub, a website that provides users with pirated copies of scholarly scientific papers. Within five years, Sci-Hub grew to contain 60 million papers and recorded over 42 million annual downloads by users. Elbakyan was finally sued by major academic publishing company Elsevier, and Sci-Hub was subsequently taken down, but it reappeared under different domain names.
2011: Taiwanese-American astrophysicist Chung-Pei Ma led a team of scientists in discovering two of the largest black holes ever observed.
 2012: Computer scientist and cryptographer Shafi Goldwasser won the Turing award for her contributions to cryptography and complexity theory.
 2013: Canadian genetic specialist Turi King identified the 500-year-old skeletal remains of King Richard III.
 2013: Kenyan ichthyologist Dorothy Wanja Nyingi published the first guide to freshwater fish species of Kenya.
 2014: Norwegian psychologist and neuroscientist May-Britt Moser received the Nobel Prize in Physiology or Medicine, shared with Edvard Moser and John O'Keefe, "for their discoveries of cells that constitute a positioning system in the brain".
 2014: American paleoclimatologist and marine geologist Maureen Raymo became the first woman to be awarded the Wollaston Medal, the highest award of the Geological Society of London.
 2014: American theoretical physicist Shirley Ann Jackson was awarded the National Medal of Science. Jackson had been the first African-American woman to receive a PhD from the Massachusetts Institute of Technology (MIT) during the early 1970s, and the first woman to chair the U.S. Nuclear Regulatory Commission.
 2014: Iranian mathematician Maryam Mirzakhani became the first woman to receive the Fields Medal, for her work in "the dynamics and geometry of Riemann surfaces and their moduli spaces".
 2015: Chinese medical scientist Tu Youyou received the Nobel Prize in Physiology or Medicine, shared with William C. Campbell and Satoshi Ōmura; she received it "for her discoveries concerning a novel therapy against Malaria".
2015: Asha de Vos became the first Sri Lankan person to receive a PhD in marine mammal research, completing her thesis on "Factors influencing blue whale aggregations off southern Sri Lanka" at the University of Western Australia.
 2016: Marcia McNutt became the first woman president of the American National Academy of Sciences.
 2018: British astrophysicists Hiranya Peiris and Joanna Dunkley and Italian cosmologist Licia Verde were among 27 scientists awarded the Breakthrough Prize in Fundamental Physics for their contributions to "detailed maps of the early universe that greatly improved our knowledge of the evolution of the cosmos and the fluctuations that seeded the formation of galaxies".
 2018: British astrophysicist Jocelyn Bell Burnell received the special Breakthrough Prize in Fundamental Physics for her scientific achievements and "inspiring leadership", worth $3 million. She donated the entirety of the prize money towards the creation of scholarships to assist women, underrepresented minorities and refugees who are pursuing the study of physics.
 2018: Canadian physicist Donna Strickland received the Nobel Prize in Physics "for groundbreaking inventions in the field of laser physics"; she shared it with Arthur Ashkin and Gérard Mourou.
 2018: Frances Arnold received the Nobel Prize in Chemistry "for the directed evolution of enzymes"; she shared it with George Smith and Gregory Winter, who received it "for the phage display of peptides and antibodies". This made Frances the first American woman to receive the Nobel Prize in Chemistry.
 2018: For the first time in history, women received the Nobel Prize in Chemistry and the Nobel Prize in Physics in the same year.
 2019: Mathematician Karen Uhlenbeck became the first woman to win the Abel Prize for "her pioneering achievements in geometric partial differential equations, gauge theory, and integrable systems, and for the fundamental impact of her work on analysis, geometry and mathematical physics".
 2019: Imaging scientist Katie Bouman developed an algorithm that made the first visualization of a black hole possible using the Event Horizon Telescope. She was part of the team of over 200 people who implemented the project.

2020s 

 2020: The Nigerian Academy of Science elected epidemiologist/parasitologist Ekanem Braide as its first female president.
 2020: Brazilian Scientist and Researcher Jaqueline Goes de Jesus, sequenced COVID-19 genome in 12 hours.
 2020: Biochemists Jennifer Doudna (American) and Emmanuelle Charpentier (French) received the Nobel Prize in Chemistry for their work on CRISPR genome editing tool.
 2020: Andrea M. Ghez received the Nobel Prize in Physics for the discovery of a supermassive compact object.
 2020: German-Turkish scientist Özlem Türeci is the co-founder and chief medical officer of BioNTech. Her team developed BNT162b2 (tozinameran (INN)), commonly known as the Pfizer–BioNTech COVID-19 vaccine.
 2020: British vaccinologist Sarah Gilbert leads the development and testing of a vaccine which becomes the Oxford–AstraZeneca COVID-19 vaccine.
 2022: American chemist Carolyn R. Bertozzi received the Nobel Prize in Chemistry for  her development of  Bioorthogonal chemistry.
 2023: Australian geomicrobiologist Jillian Banfield became the first female recipient of the van Leeuwenhoek Medal, which she received for her studies of complex microbial communities and their interaction with the environment.

See also
List of female scientists before the 20th century
 Lists of women in science
 Timeline of women in geology
 Timeline of women in library science
 Timeline of women in computing
 Timeline of women in mathematics
 Timeline of women in mathematics in the United States
 Timeline of women in science in the United States
 Timeline of women's education
 Women in physics

References

External links
Famous female scientists: A timeline of pioneering women in science from the website of Dr Helen Klus

science
Science timelines
Women scientists